Aneeta Kamal is an Indian politician and a member of 17th Legislative Assembly of Uttar Pradesh of India. She represents the Alapur (Assembly constituency) in Ambedkar Nagar district of Uttar Pradesh and is a member of the Bharatiya Janata Party.

Early life and education
Kamal was born 23 March 1986 in Khatamipur village in Ambedkar Nagar district of Uttar Pradesh to father Ram Parit. In 2006, she married  Awadhesh Kumar, they have two sons. He belongs to Scheduled Caste (Chamar) community. In 2010, he attended Baba Barua Das Mahavidhyalaya Maruiya Ashram (Avadh University) and attained Master of Arts degree.

Political career
Kamal has been MLA for one term. She was successful in the legislature in the first attempt. In 17th Legislative Assembly of Uttar Pradesh (2017) elections, she defeated Samajwadi Party candidate Sangeeta by a margin of 12,513 votes.

Posts held

References

Uttar Pradesh MLAs 2017–2022
Bharatiya Janata Party politicians from Uttar Pradesh
Living people
People from Ambedkar Nagar district
1986 births